Buckingham Township may refer to the following townships in the United States:

 Buckingham Township, Tama County, Iowa
 Buckingham Township, Bucks County, Pennsylvania
 Buckingham Township, Wayne County, Pennsylvania